Songs of Ascension is an album by Meredith Monk. It was released on May 13, 2011, by ECM New Series. It was recorded at the BAM Harvey Theater, in New York, in 2009.

It peaked at #8 on Billboard'''s Traditional Classical Albums chart.

Critical receptionThe Washington Post called the recording "radiant," writing that "although simple in its means, it is unusually rich, for Monk, in its timbres and textures." The Independent'' wrote that "it's an innovative, provocative but enjoyable work, exploring the relations between voices and instruments ... Tremendous stuff."

Track listing

Personnel 
Musicians
Sasha Bogdanowitsch – vocals
Heather J. Buchanan – conductor
Sidney Chen – vocals
Emily Eagen – vocals
Ellen Fisher – shruti box, vocals
Katie Geissinger – shruti box, vocals
Ching Gonzalez – shruti box, vocals
Bohdan Hilash – alto saxophone, bass clarinet, khene, shruti Box
John Hollenbeck – percussion, shruti box, vocals
Ha-Yang Kim – cello, vocals
Meredith Monk – shruti box, vocals, mixing
Holly Nadal – vocals
Toby Newman – vocals
Courtney Orlando – violin, vocals
Bruce Rameker – shruti box, vocals
Todd Reynolds – violin
Peter Sciscioli – vocals
Nadia Sirota – viola, vocals
Allison Sniffin – shruti box, vocals
Production
Manfred Eicher – production, mixing
James A. Farber – engineering, mixing
Marion Gray – photography
Sascha Kleis – design
Paul Zinman – engineering

References 

2011 albums
Albums produced by Manfred Eicher
ECM New Series albums
Meredith Monk albums